Paris Law School may refer to:

 Faculty of Law of Paris (c. 1150 – 1970)
 Paris 2 Panthéon-Assas University (from 1971), the direct inheritor of the Faculty of Law of Paris
 The Faculty of Law of the Université Paris Cité (from 2019)

See also
 Law schools in France
 Sorbonne Law School (disambiguation)